The Men's 105 kilograms event at the 2018 Asian Games took place on 26 August 2018 at the Jakarta International Expo Hall A.

Schedule
All times are Western Indonesia Time (UTC+07:00)

Records

Results
Legend
NM — No mark

New records
The following records were established during the competition.

References

External links
Weightlifting at the 2018 Asian Games
Official Result Book Weightlifting at awfederation.com

Men's 105 kg